Josef "Sepp" Uhlmann (21 October 1902 – 20 July 1968) was a German fencer. He competed in the team épée event at the 1936 Summer Olympics.

References

External links
 

1902 births
1968 deaths
German male fencers
Olympic fencers of Germany
Fencers at the 1936 Summer Olympics
People from Laupheim
Sportspeople from Tübingen (region)